The 2016 U.S. Olympic gymnastics team trials were split into separate events for Women's Artistic Gymnastics and Men's Artistic Gymnastics.  The women's event was held from July 8 to 10, 2016 at the SAP Center in San Jose, California and the men's event was held June 23–26, 2016 at Chaifetz Arena in St. Louis, Missouri.

Venue 
The women's event was held at the SAP Center, which has a capacity of up to 19,190 spectators for concerts and hosted the 2012 U.S. Olympic trials, which held both women's and men's artistic gymnastics events. It is home to the National Hockey League team, the San Jose Sharks.  The men's event was held at Chaifetz Arena.

Promotion 
In February 2016, 2008 Olympian Shawn Johnson visited the San Jose area to promote the women's event.  2012 Olympian Jordyn Wieber visited St. Louis to promote the men's event in early June.

Ticket sales 
On May 3, 2016, it was revealed that the competition had sold out.

Participants

Broadcast 
NBC broadcast both nights of competition at trials.

Results

Final standings

Final scores
Full Olympic trial scores are as follows:

Olympic team selection

Women's team 

Simone Biles, Aly Raisman, Laurie Hernandez, Madison Kocian, and Gabby Douglas were selected to represent the United States at the 2016 Summer Olympics in Rio de Janeiro, Brazil.  MyKayla Skinner, Ragan Smith, and Ashton Locklear were selected as the three alternates.

Men's team 
Sam Mikulak was automatically named to the Olympic team after scoring the highest four day all-around total from both Olympic trials and the 2016 National Championships.  The selection committee then named Chris Brooks, Alex Naddour, Jacob Dalton, and John Orozco to the team.  Danell Leyva, Akash Modi, and Donnell Whittenburg were named as the alternates.

Two weeks after the Olympic trials Orozco tore his ACL and meniscus.  Levya was selected as his replacement.

References 

Gymnastics
2016 in gymnastics
2016 in sports in California
2016 in sports in Missouri
Gymnastics at the 2016 Summer Olympics